Corinna "Cory" Everson (née Kneuer; born January 4, 1958) is an American female bodybuilding champion and actress. Everson won the Ms. Olympia contest six years in a row from 1984 to 1989.

Education
Corinna Kneuer was born in Racine, Wisconsin and attended high school in Deerfield, Illinois.  She attended the University of Wisconsin–Madison, where she was a multi-sport standout (gymnastics, track & field and badminton).

Early career
While attending the University of Wisconsin–Madison, she met Jeff Everson, a competitive bodybuilder who worked there as a strength coach. They married in 1982. While they were married, the Eversons built a successful mail-order clothing business called Sampson and Delilah.

Bodybuilding career
Everson began to train seriously as a bodybuilder after her graduation, and made rapid progress. In the early years, she and Jeff trained at Ernie's Gym on Sherman Avenue in Madison.

She won the Ms. Olympia contest at her first participation and remained undefeated from 1984 to 1989 when she retired from competition.

Contest history
1980 Ms. Mid America - 1st (Tall and Overall)
1980 American Couples - 3rd (with Jeff Everson)
1981 Ms. Midwest Open - 1st (Tall & Overall)
1981 Ms. Central USA - 1st (HW and Overall)
1981 Couples America - 1st (with Jeff Everson)
1981 American Championships - 11th (MW)
1982 Ms. East Coast - 1st (MW)
1982 Bodybuilding Expo III - 2nd (MW)
1982 Bodybuilding Expo Couples - 2nd (with Jeff Everson)
1982 AFWB American Championships - 5th (HW)
1982 IFBB North American - 1st (MW and Overall)
1982 IFBB North American Mixed Pairs - 1st
1983 Bodybuilding Expo IV - 1st (MW and Overall)
1983 Bodybuilding Expo Mixed Pairs - 1st
1983 U.S. Bodybuilding Championships Couples - 1st (with Jeff Everson)
1983 AFWB American Championships - 8th (HW)
1983 NPC Nationals - 2nd (HW)
1984 American Women's Championships - 1st (HW and Overall)
1984 NPC Nationals - 1st (HW and Overall)
1984 IFBB Ms. Olympia - 1st
1985 IFBB Ms. Olympia - 1st
1986 IFBB Ms. Olympia - 1st
1987 IFBB Ms. Olympia - 1st
1988 IFBB Ms. Olympia - 1st
1989 IFBB Ms. Olympia - 1st

Awards and honors
In January 1999, Everson was inducted into the IFBB Hall of Fame, as part of the inaugural group. She was inducted into the Muscle Beach Venice Body Building Hall of Fame on September 5, 2005.

At the 2007 Arnold Classic she became the first woman to be presented with the Lifetime Achievement Award, and in 2008 was inducted into the National Fitness Hall of Fame.

Film and television career
After retiring from competition, she turned to acting with her first major movie appearance being Double Impact (1991) alongside Jean-Claude Van Damme.  She took a minor role in Natural Born Killers (1994). Then in Ballistic (1995), she reprised the evil musclewoman role, losing the final fight to Marjean Holden playing an undercover cop.

Everson has made a number of guest appearances in television series, most notably playing Atalanta on Hercules: The Legendary Journeys. She appeared in two episodes of The Adventures of Brisco County, Jr. with her sister, Cameo Kneuer.

In 1991 Everson appeared on To Tell The Truth Game Show.

Everson was the original host of the fitness show BodyShaping, which she also produced. She also hosted her own exercise show on ESPN, Cory Everson's Gotta Sweat, for seven years.

Film
{| class="wikitable" style="font-size: 95%;"
! Year 
! Title
! Role 
! Notes
|-
| 1986 
| The Morning After 
| Miss Olympia 
|
|-
| 1989
| The girl from outer space
| Lab Guard #1
|
|-
| 1991 
| Double Impact 
| Kara 
|
|-
| 1994
| Natural Born Killers 
| TV Mallory Knox
|
|-
| 1995 
| Ballistic 
| Claudia 
|
|-
| 1996
| Felony 
| Sondra 
|
|-
| 1997
| Sacred Trust
| Grace Larson
|
|-
| 1999
| My Favorite Martian| SETI Guard
| Uncredited
|-
|}

Television

Personal life
Cory and Jeff Everson divorced in 1996; however, she kept 'Everson' as her stage name. In 1998, she married Dr. Steve Donia, a cosmetic dentist; they have two children whom they adopted from Russia. She became active with Nightlight Christian Adoptions, an adoption agency that brings orphans from Russia and Belarus to the US to stay with families looking to adopt a child.

Everson's sister, Cameo Kneuer, is a two-time Ms. National Fitness champion and a mainstay of the TV game series Knights and Warriors.

Books authoredStrength Training for Beauty Volume 3 - Number 1Runner's World Magazine Company (1986)Superflex: Ms. Olympia's Guide to Building a Strong & Sexy Body Contemporary Books (1987)  with Jeff EversonBack in Shape Houghton Mifflin Company (1991)  with Stephen HochschulerCory Everson's Workout Perigee Trade (1991)  with Jeff EversonCory Everson's Fat-Free & Fit Perigee Trade (1994)  with Carole JacobsCory Everson's Lifebalance'' Perigee Trade (1998)

References

External links
Facebook Page
Ms Olympia 1986 online - Cory everson win

Cory Everson fitness filmography at Rotten Tomatoes

| colspan = 3 align = center | Ms. Olympia
|-
| width = 30% align = center | Preceded by:Carla Dunlap
| width = 40% align = center | First (1984)
| width = 30% align = center | Succeeded by:Herself
|-
| width = 30% align = center | Preceded by:Herself
| width = 40% align = center | Second (1985)
| width = 30% align = center | Succeeded by:Herself
|-
| width = 30% align = center | Preceded by:Herself
| width = 40% align = center | Third (1986)
| width = 30% align = center | Succeeded by:Herself
|-
| width = 30% align = center | Preceded by:Herself
| width = 40% align = center | Fourth (1987)
| width = 30% align = center | Succeeded by:Herself
|-
| width = 30% align = center | Preceded by:Herself
| width = 40% align = center | Fifth (1988)
| width = 30% align = center | Succeeded by:Herself
|-
| width = 30% align = center | Preceded by:Herself
| width = 40% align = center | Sixth (1989)
| width = 30% align = center | Succeeded by:Lenda Murray

1958 births
American exercise and fitness writers
American exercise instructors
American female bodybuilders
American film actresses
American television actresses
Living people
People from Deerfield, Illinois
Professional bodybuilders
Sportspeople from Racine, Wisconsin
21st-century American women